Claud Syms Scott (31 August 1901 – 14 October 1983) was Archdeacon of Suffolk from 1962.

Scott was educated at Brentwood School and Trinity College, Oxford. He was ordained in 1927 and began his career with a curacy in Bedminster. He was Curate in charge at All Hallows Ipswich from 1930 to 1938; Vicar of Exning with Landwade from 1938 to 1954;Master of the Worshipful Company of Armourers and Brasiers in 1951; Rural Dean of Newmarket from 1946 to 1954;Rector of Stradbroke with Horham and Athelington from 1954 to 1958;Rector of St Mary Stoke from 1958 to 1962; Rural Dean of Ipswich from 1958 to 1961; and Vicar of Hoxne with Denham St John from 1962 to 1970.

References

1901 births
1983 deaths
Alumni of Trinity College, Oxford
Alumni of Ripon College Cuddesdon
People educated at Brentwood School, Essex
Archdeacons of Suffolk